Megaforce Records is an American independent record label founded in 1982 by Jon Zazula and his wife Marsha Zazula to release the first works of Metallica, and devoted primarily to hard rock and heavy metal. It has offices in New York City (where the corporate office is located) and Philadelphia. The label is distributed in the United States by RED Distribution, having previously been distributed by Atlantic Records while Anthrax's recordings from 1985 to 1991 were marketed by Island Records.

Megaforce artists that have appeared on the Billboard Top 200 chart include Metallica, Blue October, Anthrax, Overkill, Testament, Mushroomhead, Ministry, Bad Brains and Meat Puppets. The Black Crowes and Meat Puppets have both received various RIAA certifications in the US.

Marsha Zazula, the co-founder of Megaforce Records, died of cancer on January 10, 2021, at the age of 68. Her husband Jon died a year later, on February 1, 2022, at the age of 69.

Artists (current and former)

Heavy metal artists

 Anthrax

 Blessed Death
 Blue Cheer
 Brendon Small
 Frehley's Comet
 Eric Steel
 Exciter
 Fozzy
 Grave Digger
 Icon
 King's X
 Living Colour
 Lucy Brown
 Manowar
 Mercyful Fate
 Metallica
 Ministry
 M.O.D.
 Mushroomhead

 Overkill
 Prophet
 Raven
 Skatenigs
 Skid Row
 Stormtroopers of Death (S.O.D)
 Sweaty Nipples
 Testament
 Trust
 T.T. Quick
 Vio-lence

Other artists

 Ace Frehley
 Bad Brains
 Björk
 Blue October
 Das Racist
 Heems
 Disco Biscuits
 Hank Williams III
 Lostprophets
 Meat Puppets
 They Might Be Giants
 Tribe After Tribe
 Truth & Salvage Co.
 Warren Haynes
 Wellwater Conspiracy
 Johnny Winter

References

External links

Record labels established in 1982
American independent record labels
Heavy metal record labels
Thrash metal record labels
Alternative rock record labels
1982 establishments in the United States